Bucksport can refer to:

 Bucksport, California
 Bucksport, Maine 
 Bucksport (CDP), Maine
 Bucksport, South Carolina